Hamdan Al Nahyan may refer people with Hamdan given name in Al Nahyan royal house, may refer to:
Hamdan bin Zayed bin Khalifa Al Nahyan (1912–1922) ruler of Abu Dhabi, son of Zayed II
Hamdan bin Zayed bin Sultan Al Nahyan (born 1963) son of Zayed II of Abu Dhabi, United Arab Emirati politician
Hamdan bin Mohammed Al Nahyan (1930–1989?) United Arab Emirati politician